Lake Rowan is a locality in northern Victoria, Australia. It is in the local government area of the Shire of Moira. The locality is named for "Lake Rowan"—a reserve with a dry swamp.

It is said that Ned Kelly used local resident Mr. Swanhill to sell his horses in October 1877. Lake Rowan post office opened on 1 July 1875 and was closed on 30 November 1981. The town has a cemetery (first burial 1870s) with former Geelong and Carlton (Premiership Player) Jim Flynn (1871–1955) interred.

References

External links

Towns in Victoria (Australia)
Shire of Moira